James or Jimmy Harrower may refer to:

 James Harrower (politician) (1833–1892), farmer and political figure in Manitoba
James Harrower (footballer, born 1878), see list of Hibernian F.C. players
 Jimmy Harrower (footballer, born 1935) (1935–2006), Scottish footballer
 Jimmy Harrower (footballer, born 1924) (1924–1992), Scottish footballer